Estampado (In English: "Printed" or "Stamped") is the third studio album from Brazilian singer Ana Carolina, available on January 8, 2003. The album features Seu Jorge on the song "O Beat da Beata". It sold 200 000 in Brazil, being certified platinum twice.

Track listing

Charts

Year-end charts

Certifications

Participation in soundtracks
 "Uma Louca Tempestade" was part of the soundtrack of the novel "Senhora do Destino" of Rede Globo.
 "Nua" was part of the soundtrack of the novel "Como Uma Onda" of Rede Globo.
 "Pra Rua Me Levar" was part of the soundtrack of the novel "America's" Rede Globo.
 "Encostar Na Tua" on the soundtrack of the soap opera "Celebridade" of Rede Globo.

Personnel
 Liminha – producer
 Ana Carolina – co-producer
 Sérgio Bittencourt – artistic direction
 Marilene Gondim Toward – director of production
 Remo Brandasile – executive producer
 Jefferson – executive producer
 Marisa – executive producer

References

2003 albums
Ana Carolina albums
Sony BMG albums
RCA Records albums